H. concinna may refer to:

 Haemaphysalis concinna, a rodent tick
 Helicostyla concinna, a land snail
 Hemidaphne concinna, a sea snail
 Heterocithara concinna, a sea snail
 Hibbertia concinna, an Australian plant